Louisiana Highway 98 (LA 98) is a state highway located in southern Louisiana.  It runs  in an east–west direction from the junction of LA 97 and LA 1123 west of Iota to the Lafayette–St. Martin parish line east of Carencro.

The route traverses the rural area north of and parallel to Interstate 10 (I-10) and U.S. Highway 90 (US 90) between Jennings and Lafayette.  It briefly dips southward into the city of Rayne and intersects I-10 by way of a concurrency with LA 35.  Otherwise, LA 98 largely passes through small rural communities, such as Iota, Maxie, Roberts Cove, and Mire.  Near the east end of its route, LA 98 cuts between the adjacent cities of Lafayette and Carencro.

LA 98 was designated in the 1955 Louisiana Highway renumbering from portions of ten former routes.  It thus takes a segmented and serpentine path through much of Acadia Parish.  In Lafayette Parish, however, the route was almost entirely relocated onto the straight alignment of Gloria Switch Road around 1990.  Rather the terminating in the center of Carencro, the current route passes through an interchange with I-49/US 167 south of town and extends eastward to what was formerly LA 354.  Most of LA 98 is planned to be eliminated from the state highway system as part of the Louisiana Department of Transportation and Development's (La DOTD) Road Transfer Program.

Route description

Iota to Rayne
From the west, LA 98 begins at a junction with LA 97 (Evangeline Highway) and LA 1123 (Des Cannes Highway) west of Iota, a small town in Acadia Parish.  The route heads due east as an undivided two-lane highway on Des Cannes Highway through rural farmland, broken briefly by a wooded area on either side of Bayou Des Cannes.  LA 98 follows West Kennedy Avenue into Iota and intersects LA 91.  The two highways zigzag through town concurrently, south onto Frey Street, southeast onto Duson Avenue (the main street), and southwest onto 5th Street.  About  beyond the local high school, LA 98 turns due east onto St. Joseph Avenue and heads out of town.

LA 98 crosses the Acadiana Railway (AKDN) line at Maxie and zigzags briefly onto LA 13, connecting with Crowley to the south and Eunice to the north.  For the next , the highway takes a winding course southeastward through Roberts Cove and into the city of Rayne.

Rayne to Carencro
In Rayne, LA 98 intersects LA 35 just north of that highway's interchange with I-10 (exit 87), connecting with Lafayette to the east and Lake Charles to the west.  LA 98 turns south and overlaps LA 35 through the diamond interchange, where the roadway is briefly widened to a divided four-lane capacity.  Once the highway leaves the commercial corridor situated near the exit, the median is discontinued as LA 35 and LA 98 proceed south along what is locally known as The Boulevard.  After about six blocks, LA 98 turns east onto Jeff Davis Avenue and returns to two-lane capacity while LA 35 continues ahead toward the downtown area situated along US 90.

Shortly after exiting the Rayne city limits, LA 98 turns north onto Grand Prairie Highway and crosses back over I-10 without intersecting it.  After passing through Arceneaux, LA 98 resumes its eastward course at Castille and crosses LA 95 at Mire, north of Duson.  The highway has a brief concurrency with LA 343 that ends at a T-intersection marking the boundary of three parishes: Acadia, Lafayette, and St. Landry.

LA 98 continues due east into Lafayette Parish and intersects LA 93 at a roundabout located north of Scott.  The route follows Gloria Switch Road into the sprawling, rural city of Carencro, located adjacent to the larger city of Lafayette.  LA 98 intersects LA 182 (North University Avenue) then begins to straddle the line between the two cities.  Shortly after making two ° turns, LA 98 passes through a diamond interchange with the concurrent I-49/US 167 at exit 2.  The highway continues east for another  until reaching its terminus at a T-intersection with Sawmill Highway, a local road.

Route classification and data
LA 98 has several functional classifications over the course of its route, as determined by the Louisiana Department of Transportation and Development (La DOTD). It is classified as an urban principal arterial in Carencro and an urban minor arterial in Rayne. Outside of these cities, the highway ranges from a rural major collector through the Iota area to a rural local road over the lightly traveled portions near Maxie and Mire. Daily traffic volume in 2013 peaked at 18,500 vehicles in Rayne and 7,000 through Carencro. The rural portions of the route generally averaged less than 3,000 vehicles daily with a low of 970 reported between Maxie and Roberts Cove.

History
In the original Louisiana Highway system in use between 1921 and 1955, LA 98 was part of a number of different routes including: State Route 370 from the western terminus to Iota, State Route 1044 to Maxie, State Route 368 to Roberts Cove, State Route 365 to Rayne, State Route 363 to Castille, State Route 1021 to Mire, State Route 117 just east of Mire, State Route 989 into Lafayette Parish, State Route 161 to Vatican, and State Route 178 to Carencro.  These route segments were joined under the single designation of LA 98 when the Louisiana Department of Highways renumbered the state highway system in 1955.

The two significant changes to the route since the 1955 renumbering have resulted from the nearby construction of interstate highways.  In December 1966, I-10 was completed through the Rayne area with an interchange that disrupted the right-of-way of LA 98.  The highway was re-routed to make a longer loop through town that included a concurrency with LA 35.  Three years earlier, US 167 was moved from what is now LA 182 onto a new four-lane alignment through Carencro with partial access control.  It included an interchange with Gloria Switch Road, a local road, located south of town.  Between 1981 and 1983, the new alignment of US 167 was upgraded to interstate standards as part of I-49.  Around 1990, LA 98 was moved from its original serpentine route that terminated in the center of Carencro.  It was re-routed to follow Gloria Switch Road to the I-49/US 167 interchange, a more logical traffic pattern, and continue to the parish line at what was once LA 354 (Sawmill Highway, now a local road).

Future
Under this plan of "right-sizing" the state highway system, most of LA 98 is proposed for deletion as it no longer meets a significant interurban travel function. The main exception is the portion of the route west of Maxie, which passes through the town of Iota. Two other short portions near Rayne and Mire are to be retained and will likely be incorporated into the routes of connecting highways. As of 2017, the portion in Rayne from LA 35 to Llama Road is under agreement to be removed from the state highway system and transferred to local control.

Major intersections

See also

References

External links

Maps / GIS Data Homepage, Louisiana Department of Transportation and Development

0098
Transportation in Acadia Parish, Louisiana
Transportation in Lafayette Parish, Louisiana